In climbing, topo is the graphical representation (sketch drawing or a photograph with routes depicted) of a climbing route.
Topo is also a climbing guidebook of a crag or climbing area in which most routes are described graphically by such topos.

Each individual topo gives the approximate shape of the route, the important rock formations close to the route and details of the grade, lines of the various rock climbs, and protection of each section of the climb. Topo guides usually also include the length of the climbs, where exactly each climb starts, and how to get to the area of the climb. It will usually specify if a climb is a sport climb (with fixed protection) or a trad climb (traditional, e.g. needing gear to install protection during climb). Some topo guides also include extra information such as parking, approach times, sun or shade, and type of climbing (powerful, sustained etc.).

References

Climbing

fr:Topo d'escalade
nl:Klimgids